Amuilka Joy (Joice) Maduaka (born 30 September 1973) is a British track and field athlete, who competes over the 100, 200 and occasionally 400 metres. She holds the record for winning the most medals of any athlete at the British Athletics Championships, standing at 22 medals to date, including being the 100 metres champion six times, and the 200 metres champion a further three times.

Athletics career

1998
She represented England and won a bronze medal in the 4 x 100 metres relay event, at the 1998 Commonwealth Games in Kuala Lumpur, Malaysia.

2000
She represented Great Britain in the 2000 Summer Olympics.

2002
A second Commonwealth Games appearance in Manchester resulted in a second bronze medal in the 4 x 100 metres relay.

2004
She represented Great Britain again at the 2004 Summer Olympics.

2006
As women's sprinting in Britain began to develop again, Maduaka was faced with domestic challenges from athletes such as Abi Oyepitan. In 2006 Maduaka was not selected for the Commonwealth Games, but instead ran in the World Indoor Athletics Championships. In late 2006, she burst back onto the scene, setting new personal bests.

She went on to represent Great Britain at the 2006 European Championships in Athletics, finishing 4th in the final of the 100 m and finishing 2nd in the 4 x 100 m relay.

Maduaka became the British champion over 100 m and 200 m at the British Championships in 2006, beating her opposition by a considerable margin.

At the end of the year Maduaka was ranked as the fastest British athlete over 100 m and the second fastest over 200 m.

2007
At the 2007 AAA Championships she failed to defend her 100 m crown, finishing third behind Jeanette Kwakye, and also had to pull out of the final of the 200 m, despite winning her heat very convincingly, due to illness. The 200 m was also won by Kwakye.

At the 2007 European Cup first division, Maduaka finished 2nd in the individual 100 m, 1st in the 200 m and anchored the British team home to first place in the relay, winning 23 points altogether, for her team. This is the most any British athlete has ever done for their country at these championships.

Joice Maduaka was later chosen to represent her country at the 2007 World Championships in Athletics. She was excluded from the 100 m list, as Montell Douglas was the only British athlete who had obtained the A-standard whilst, Laura Turner had been selected as an improving athlete. Maduaka and Jeanette Kwakye were to be the only British representatives in the 200 m. However, Turner went on to achieve the A standard for the 100 m, meaning that GBR were permitted another athlete in the event. The committee chose Kwakye, and then replaced her in the 200 m with Emily Freeman.

Controversy
In late 2006 Maduaka and the rest of the British Women's Relay Team, represented the Europe team at the 2006 World Athletics Cup. However, the officials had placed the Europe team and the USA team in the wrong lanes, so when it came to pass the baton, they would have been passing them to the opposition. Team USA passed the batons, but team GBR (Europe) were unsure, but in the end did make a change. Both teams finished. USA was disqualified, but Europe wasn't. The race was not rerun, despite being rescheduled.

Personal bests 
100 metres- 11.23 At Manchester on 15 July 2006
200 metres- 22.83 At Birmingham on 25 July 1999

Major championships

Olympic Games
Athens 2004
 Women's 200 m: Round 1: - 23.15, Round 2 - 23.30

Sydney 2000
 Women's 100 m: Round 1 – 11.51
 Women's 200 m: Round 1 – 23.36, Round 2 – 23.57
 Women's 4 x 100 m Relay: Round 1 – 43.26, Semifinal – 43.19

World Championships
Osaka 2007
 Women's 200 m: Round 1 – 23.22, Round 2 - 23.62
 Women's 4 x 100 m Relay: Round 1 – 42.82 (SB), Final - 42.87 (4th)

Paris 2003
 Women's 100 m: Round 1 – 11.31, Round 2 - 11.29, Semifinal - 11.40
 Women's 200 m: Round 1 – 23.11, Round 2 – 23.50

Seville 1999
 Women's 100 m: Round 1 – 11.43, Round 2 - 11.28
 Women's 200 m: Round 1 – 23.27, Round 2 – 23.33
 Women's 4 x 100 m Relay: Round 1 – 43.31, Final – 43.52 (8th)

References

External links

Living people
1973 births
People from Lambeth
Athletes from London
English female sprinters
British female sprinters
Olympic female sprinters
Olympic athletes of Great Britain
Athletes (track and field) at the 2000 Summer Olympics
Athletes (track and field) at the 2004 Summer Olympics
Commonwealth Games bronze medallists for England
Commonwealth Games medallists in athletics
Athletes (track and field) at the 1998 Commonwealth Games
Athletes (track and field) at the 2002 Commonwealth Games
Athletes (track and field) at the 2010 Commonwealth Games
World Athletics Championships athletes for Great Britain
European Athletics Championships medalists
British Athletics Championships winners
AAA Championships winners
Black British sportswomen
Medallists at the 1998 Commonwealth Games
Medallists at the 2002 Commonwealth Games
Medallists at the 2010 Commonwealth Games